Dominique Cornu (born 10 October 1985) is a Belgian retired road and track cyclist from Flanders, who competed professionally between 2005 and 2015. He specialised in the time trial discipline.

Career
Cornu was born in Beveren.

At the 2006 World Cycling Championship he was crowned Under-23 Time Trial World Champion. He had previously won the Junior Belgian Time Trial Championship in 2003 and 2004, and in 2005 he became the Belgian Under-23 time trial Champion. Cornu is also an accomplished track cyclist, winning the Individual Pursuit at the 2006 Belgian Track Cycling Championships. In addition to Cornu's time trialing skills he is also a promising cobblestone rider, having won the Under-23 edition of the prestigious Omloop "Het Volk" cycling classic in 2006.

Cornu left  at the end of the 2013 season, and joined  for the 2014 season.

Major results

2003
 1st  Time trial, National Junior Road Championships
2004
 1st  Time trial, National Junior Road Championships
 1st Grand Prix des Nations Under–23
 1st Stage 3 Ronde van Vlaams-Brabant
2005
 1st  Time trial, National Under-23 Road Championships
 1st  Overall Tour de Berlin
 1st Stage 2 Tweedaagse van de Gaverstreek
 1st Stage 3 Ronde van Vlaams-Brabant
 2nd  Time trial, UEC European Under-23 Road Championships
2006
 1st  Time trial, UCI Under-23 Road World Championships
 1st  Time trial, National Under-23 Road Championships
 National Track Championships
1st  Individual pursuit
2nd  Kilo
3rd  Points race
 1st Omloop Het Nieuwsblad U23
 1st Prologue Ronde van Antwerpen
 3rd  Time trial, UEC European Under-23 Road Championships
2008
 1st Stage 4 Giro del Capo
2010
 2nd Overall Tour of Belgium
1st  Young rider classification
1st Stage 4 (ITT)
 4th Time trial, National Road Championships
2011
 7th Overall Eneco Tour

References

External links
  
 
 
 

1985 births
Living people
Belgian male cyclists
Flemish sportspeople
Belgian track cyclists
Cyclists at the 2012 Summer Olympics
Olympic cyclists of Belgium
People from Beveren
Cyclists from East Flanders